The Derry Senior Hurling Championship is an annual hurling competition contested by top-tier Derry GAA clubs. The Derry County Board of the Gaelic Athletic Association has organised it since 1887.

Slaughtneil are the title holders (2022) defeating Kevin Lynch's in the Final in September 2022 to win their tenth title in a row.

Honours
The trophy presented to the winners is the Fr Collins Cup.

The winners qualify to represent their county in the Ulster Senior Club Hurling Championship. The winners can, in turn, go on to play in the All-Ireland Senior Club Hurling Championship.

List of finals

Notes
† 1891, 1905: St Patrick's, Waterside is now defunct. It was a club from the Waterside in Derry City.

†† 1946: Kevin Barry's is now defunct. It was a club from Derry City.

Wins listed by club

Notes
† The 1967, 1972, 1973, 1974, 1975, 1976, 1977, 1979 and 1981 titles were won as Dungiven GAC.

†† Burt is a Donegal club.

References

External links
Official Derry Website
Derry on Hoganstand
Derry Club GAA

 
Derry GAA club championships
Hurling competitions in County Londonderry
Senior hurling county championships
Hurling competitions in Northern Ireland
Hurling competitions in Ulster